Chilakawad is a village in Dharwad district of Karnataka, India.

Demographics 
As of the 2011 Census of India there were 255 households in Chilakawad and a total population of 1,295 consisting of 666 males and 629 females. There were 121 children ages 0-6.

References

Villages in Dharwad district